Kulinich or Kulynych (Ukrainian or Russian: Кулинич) is a gender-neutral Slavic surname that may refer to the following notable people:
Aleksandr Kulinitš (born 24 May 1992), Estonian football defender 
Anna Kulinich-Sorokina (born 1992), Russian Paralympian athlete 
Mykola Kulinich (born 1953), Ukrainian diplomat
Natalya Kulinich (born 1988), Kazakhstani volleyball player
Olha Kulynych (born 2000), Ukrainian racing cyclist
Sergey Kulinich (born 1960), Russian association football coach and player
Serhiy Kulynych (born 1995), Ukrainian football defender

See also
 

Ukrainian-language surnames